Antissella is a genus of flies in the family Stratiomyidae.

Species
Antissella alicespringsensis Lessard & Woodley, 2021
Antissella elongata Lessard & Woodley, 2021
Antissella kalbarriensis Lessard & Woodley, 2021
Antissella nigricentalis Lessard & Woodley, 2021
Antissella ottensorum Lessard & Woodley, 2021
Antissella parvidentata (Macquart, 1850)
Antissella purprasina Lessard & Woodley, 2021
Antissella quinquecella (Macquart, 1846)

References

Stratiomyidae
Brachycera genera
Diptera of Australasia